Gabbitas is a surname. Notable people with the surname include:

Brian Gabbitas (born 1935), English former professional rugby league footballer
Christopher Gabbitas (born 1979), English choral conductor, lawyer and university professor
Christina Gabbitas (born 1967), English children's author, poet, storyteller and voiceover artist
Harry Gabbitas (1905–1954), English professional footballer